Christophe Izard (30 May 1937 – 31 July 2022) was a French television producer.

Select filmography
L'île aux Enfants
Albert the Fifth Musketeer

References

External links
 
 

1937 births
2022 deaths
French television producers
People from Paris